Theoretical Inquiries in Law is a biannual peer-reviewed Israeli law journal published by Tel Aviv University. It is the only English law journal published by the school, and one out of two published in English in Israel, alongside Israel Law Review. 

Israeli law journals
Tel Aviv University
Publications established in 2000
Biannual journals
English-language journals